Yacouba Isaac Zida (born 16 November 1965) is a Burkinabé military officer who briefly served as Burkina Faso's acting head of state in November 2014. He took power in the aftermath of the 2014 Burkinabé uprising, sidelining a more senior officer, Honoré Nabéré Traoré. A few weeks later, a civilian, Michel Kafando, was chosen to replace Zida as transitional head of state; Kafando then appointed Zida as Prime Minister on 19 November 2014.

Zida was briefly removed from office by the Regiment of Presidential Security in a September 2015 coup, but he was restored as Prime Minister within a week.

Early career
Zida obtained a master's degree in International Management from the University of Lyon. He also received military training from the American army. Under President Blaise Compaoré, he served as deputy commander of the Regiment of Presidential Security. He was a UN peacekeeper in Democratic Republic of the Congo from 2008 to 2009.

2014 Burkinabé uprising

During the 2014 Burkinabé uprising, President Compaoré resigned on 31 October 2014 and army chief Honoré Nabéré Traoré announced that he was taking over as head of state, but his claim to power was immediately contested by a group of junior officers headed by Zida, who aligned himself with the protesters. On 1 November 2014, the armed forces unanimously backed Zida to lead the country in an interim capacity towards the 2015 presidential election.

On 17 November 2014, a civilian, Michel Kafando, was chosen to replace Zida as transitional head of state, and he was sworn in on 18 November. Kafando then appointed Zida as Prime Minister of Burkina Faso on 19 November 2014. In the transitional government, appointed on 23 November, Zida held the defense portfolio in addition to his role as Prime Minister.

In mid-2015 there was a dispute between Zida and the Regiment of Presidential Security. In early July it was reported that he had resigned, but he refuted the reports and criticized the press for careless reporting. Nevertheless, he faced opposition from the military as well as Compaoré supporters, leaving him in a precarious position, although he maintained the support of Sankarists led by Bénéwendé Sankara. On 19 July 2015, President Kafando stripped Zida of the defense portfolio and took over the portfolio himself. He also dismissed Auguste Denise Barry, who was closely associated with Zida, from his key post as Minister of Territorial Administration and Security.

On 16 September 2015, two days after a recommendation from the National Reconciliation and Reforms Commission to disband the Regiment of Presidential Security (RSP), members of the RSP  detained President Kafando and Prime Minister Zida. On 23 September, after the coup failed, Zida was reinstated as Prime Minister.

In November 2015, near the end of the transitional period, Zida was promoted from the rank of lieutenant-colonel to général de division in line with a law passed during the transition that provided for promotions to be granted "for services rendered to the nation". Roch Marc Christian Kaboré, who was elected as President, was sworn in on 29 December 2015 and subsequently appointed Paul Kaba Thieba, an economist, as Prime Minister.

The law providing for Zida's promotion was scrapped by the newly elected National Assembly. With permission from President Kaboré, Zida traveled to Canada in January 2016 to visit his family. He was due to return in February, but he failed to do so despite orders from Kaboré. In December 2016, Kaboré said that Zida would be expelled from the army for desertion.

References

|-

1965 births
Burkinabé military personnel
Burkinabé Muslims
Heads of state of Burkina Faso
Leaders who took power by coup
Living people
Prime Ministers of Burkina Faso
University of Lyon alumni
21st-century Burkinabé people